Mary Perkins (May 5, 1839 – November 18, 1893) was a Union nurse during the American Civil War.

Early life
Perkins was born on May 5, 1839, in Brewer, Maine. She later moved to Enfield, Maine until the outbreak of the Civil War.

Civil War service
Perkins enlisted in 1861 as a nurse for the 11th Maine Volunteer Infantry. Shortly after, she accompanied the regiment to Washington, D.C., where she served at Brigade Hospital. In March 1862, the regiment moved, and Perkins then served at Hygeia Hospital. At this hospital, Perkins worked with Dorothea Dix throughout McClellan's Peninsula Campaign.

Perkins left the service when her brother was injured in the war.

After the war
Perkins married Andrew Perkins in April 1850. She died on November 18, 1893.

References 

Women in the American Civil War
1839 births
1893 deaths
People from Brewer, Maine
American Civil War nurses
American women nurses